The Madsen-Saetter machine gun was a Danish general-purpose machine gun designed in the early 1950s by Eric Larsen-Saetter.

Service history 

The machine gun was tested by the British Army but the FN MAG was preferred. Indonesia produced the Mark II version in .30-06 under license at Pindad. Salvadoran Army also received Madsen-Saetters in .30-06, some being latter locally modified to fire 7.62×51mm NATO rounds.

Variants 
 Madsen-Saetter Mk I
 Madsen-Saetter Mk II
 Madsen-Saetter Mk III: more reliable and shorter version, developed from 1959
 Madsen-Saetter Mk IV: new version, shorter and lighter
 Madsen-Saetter tank machine gun: prototype of tank-mounted version
 Masen-Saetter cal. 50 machine gun: prototype of a .50 BMG version

See also 
 Madsen machine gun

References 

Danish weapons
Machine guns of Denmark